Väiku-Ruuga is a settlement in Rõuge Parish, Võru County in southeastern Estonia.

References

 

Villages in Võru County